Tameem Mohammed Ahmed Al-Kubati (born 1 January 1989 in Sana'a) is a Yemeni taekwondo practitioner.

Al-Kubati won a bronze medal at the 2008 Asian Taekwondo Championships and a gold medal at the 2011 Pan Arab Games.

He competed at the 2012 Summer Olympics in the 58kg event.  He was the flag bearer of the Yemeni sports team during the opening ceremonies.   On August 8, he advanced from the preliminaries to the quarterfinals by defeating Gabriel Mercedes of the Dominican Republic (8-3).  In the quarterfinals, he was defeated by Óscar Muñoz of Colombia (2-14).

References

External links
 
 

1989 births
Living people
Yemeni male taekwondo practitioners
Olympic taekwondo practitioners of Yemen
Taekwondo practitioners at the 2012 Summer Olympics
Taekwondo practitioners at the 2010 Asian Games
Asian Games competitors for Yemen
Asian Taekwondo Championships medalists